The 2022 Arizona Senate election was held on November 8, 2022. Voters elected members of the Arizona Senate in all 30 of the state's legislative districts to serve a two-year term. Primary elections were scheduled for August 2, 2022.

Prior to the elections, the Republican Party held a narrow majority over the Democratic Party, controlling 16 seats to their 14 seats. These were be the first elections affected by redistricting resulting from the 2020 United States census.

Predictions

Overview

Closest races 
Seats where the margin of victory was under 10%:

Retiring incumbents

Republicans 
 District 1: Karen Fann retired.
District 20: Paul Boyer is retiring.
District 21: Rick Gray retired.
District 22: David Livingston was term-limited and ran for the Arizona House of Representatives.
 District 23: Michelle Ugenti-Rita retired to run for Secretary of State.

Democrats 
 District 4: Lisa Otondo retired.
 District 9: Victoria Steele retired.
 District 10: Stephanie Stahl Hamilton ran for the Arizona House of Representatives.
 District 18: Sean Bowie retired.
 District 19: Lupe Contreras was term-limited and ran for the Arizona House of Representatives.
 District 27: Rebecca Rios retired.
 District 29: Martín Quezada was term-limited and ran for State Treasurer.

Results

District 1

Republican primary

General election

District 2

District 3

Republican primary

General election

District 4

District 5

Democratic primary

General election

District 6

District 7

Republican primary

General election

District 8

District 9

Republican primary

General election

District 10

Republican primary

General election

District 11

Democratic primary

General election

District 12

Republican primary

General election

District 13

Democratic primary

General election

District 14

District 15

District 16

District 17

Republican primary

General election

District 18

Democratic primary

General election

District 19

District 20

District 21

District 22

Democratic primary

General election

District 23

District 24

Democratic primary

General election

District 25

District 26

District 27

Republican primary

General election

District 28

Republican primary

General election

District 29

Republican primary

General election

District 30

References 

Senate
Arizona Senate
Arizona Senate elections